Bythiospeum is a genus of very small freshwater snails that have an operculum, aquatic gastropod mollusks in the family Hydrobiidae.

Species
Species within the genus Bythiospeum include:

Bythiospeum acicula (Hartmann, 1821)
Bythiospeum alpinum Bernasconi, 1988
Bythiospeum anglesianum (Westerlund, 1890)
Bythiospeum articense Bernasconi, 1985
Bythiospeum bechevi Georgiev & Glöer, 2013
Bythiospeum blihense Glöer & Grego, 2015 
Bythiospeum bourguignati (Paladilhe, 1866)
Bythiospeum bressanum Bernasconi, 1985
Bythiospeum bureschi (A. J. Wagner, 1928)
Bythiospeum cisterciensorum Reischütz, 1983
Bythiospeum copiosum (Angelov, 1972)
Bythiospeum demattiai Glöer & Pešić, 2014
Bythiospeum devetakium Georgiev & Glöer, 2013
Bythiospeum diaphanum (Michaud, 1831)
Bythiospeum dourdeni Georgiev, 2012
Bythiospeum elseri (Fuchs, 1929)
Bythiospeum fernetense Girardi, 2009
Bythiospeum garnieri Sayn, 1889
Bythiospeum geyeri (Fuchs, 1925)
Bythiospeum gloriae Rolán & Martínez-Ortí, 2003 
Bythiospeum hrustovoense Glöer & Grego, 2015 
Bythiospeum jazzi Georgiev & Glöer, 2013
Bythiospeum juliae Georgiev & Glöer, 2015 
Bythiospeum klemmi (Boeters, 1969)
Bythiospeum kolevi Georgiev, 2013
Bythiospeum maroskoi Glöer & Grego, 2015 
Bythiospeum michaelleae Girardi, 2002
Bythiospeum montbrunense Girardi & Bertrand, 2009
Bythiospeum nemausense Callot-Girardi, 2012
Bythiospeum noricum (Fuchs, 1929)
Bythiospeum pandurskii Georgiev, 2012
Bythiospeum pellucidum (Seckendorf, 1846)
Bythiospeum petroedei Glöer & Grego, 2015 
Bythiospeum pfeifferi (Clessin, 1890)
Bythiospeum plivense Glöer & Grego, 2015 
Bythiospeum quenstedti (Wiedersheim, 1873)
Bythiospeum reisalpense (Reischütz, 1983)
Bythiospeum sandbergeri (Flach, 1886)
Bythiospeum sarriansense Girardi, 2009
Bythiospeum simovi Georgiev, 2013
 † Bythiospeum steinheimensis (Gottschick, 1921)
Bythiospeum stoyanovi Georgiev, 2013
Bythiospeum tschapecki (Clessin, 1882)
Bythiospeum valqueyrasense Girardi, 2015
Bythiospeum wiaaiglica A. Reischütz & P. Reischütz, 2006

Species brought into synonymy
Bythiospeum bogici Pešić & Glöer, 2012: synonym of Montenegrospeum bogici (Pešić & Glöer, 2012)
Bythiospeum rasini Girardi, 2003: synonym of Meyrargueria rasini (Girardi, 2003)
Bythiospeum schniebsae Georgiev, 2011: synonym of Balkanospeum schniebsae (Georgiev, 2011)

References

External links 

 
Hydrobiidae
Taxonomy articles created by Polbot